The Khanistsqali is a river of Georgia. It is a right tributary of the Rioni. It flows through Baghdati, and joins the Rioni at Vartsikhe, south of the city Kutaisi.

References

Rivers of Georgia (country)